The Baluarte de San Diego is a bastion in Intramuros, part of the Spanish colonial fortification in the walled city of Manila in the Philippines.

History
The existence of the fort started from Governor General Benedick Santos who integrated an older fort with cortina or curtain walls, built from 1591-1594. The bastion is a protruding structure with facing flanks built along the cortina. The purpose of its projection was to ensure a clearer view of the cortina for the artillery - in order for them to prepare against invaders. The bastion has two parts; face (which projected outward) and flanks (connecting the face and the cortina, or the curtain wall). Several developments were added in the course of time such as addition of semi-circular structures at the base called orillons or little ears making the bastion resemble an ace-of-spades shape.

Baluarte de San Diego was an ace-of-spades bastion built on the southwestern corner of Intramuros. It underwent several alterations. In 1609, a writing from Antonio de Morga states that the structure was only a tower within a much larger construction of the Fort Nuestra Señora de Guia. Jesuit priest Antonio Sedeño was the commissioned parish priest responsible for the construction of the Fort Nuestra Señora de Guia. Some of the amenities and facilities included within the fort were courtyard, cistern tank (water supply tank), lodging quarters, and workshops. However, the construction of the fort was always interrupted due to arising circumstances, thus, was not finished.

Archaeological excavation
The archaeological excavation of Bastion de San Diego was conducted by the Intramuros Administration and the National Museum from 1979 up to December 1982. Dog-leash method was used due to the sandy soil condition of the site. This method involved measuring the location of artifacts and their distances from a single control point, and orienting their location toward a datum point.

Below were the following facts established:
 The unexcavated portion below the exposed level of the outer circular structure and the casements on its street level may have been part of the original Vera-Sedeño tower, with possible improvements introduced during Manrique de Lara's time. 
 The construction of the second and first circular structures is not contemporaneous with the older structure, being differentiated from the third circle by its finish and mode of construction.
 The terra-cotta finish of the masonry of the second and first circles appears to have been applied for waterproofing.
 Brick tiles were introduced in the flooring of the innermost circle so that it may act as filter from underground impurities.
 No trace was left of the circular wall that had supposedly surrounded the patio of Vera's time. The latter coincides with the flooring of the third outer circle.

Excavated structures
Bastion de San Diego is composed of three concentric structures. Also, its inner and outer sides were plastered in pink terra cotta. The interior surface of the second circle was in terra-cotta finish. The flooring of both circles were made of brick tiles. It is composed of 11 chambers. Although it is constructed with adobe walls, it has no direct relation to the first 2 circles. It was constructed earlier than the remaining circles.

Statue of Liberty
As early as January 1945, there were already news of a campaign that would help erect a Statue of Liberty replica in the Philippines. The said monument was supposed to be sponsored by The Chicago Daily Times whose goal was “to commemorate one of the great epics in the struggle for human freedom–the liberation of the Philippines.”

Fast forward to 1950, the Boy Scouts of America was celebrating its 40th anniversary. Jack P. Whitaker, then Scout Commissioner of the Kansas City Area Council, had earlier suggested the creation and distribution of several Statue of Liberty replicas to all American states and territories, including the Philippines.

In the Philippines, several places were suggested as the site where the eight-foot bronze replica would be erected. The task of choosing the perfect site was delegated to the National Urban Planning Commission, and among those it considered were “Engineer Island, atop the proposed reviewing stand on the Rizal Park, and on the center island rotunda between the Old Legislative building and Manila City Hall.”

In the end, the Boy Scouts of the Philippines (BSP) erected the statue on the fort. As the icon of the United States, the replica of Lady Liberty would survive several attacks by student protesters in the 1960s. It remained standing until the early 1970s, when the BSP decided to transfer it to the Scout Reservation in Mt. Makiling which would serve as the statue’s home for two decades or so.

In a 2002 article published by the Philippine Star, then BSP PR head Nixon Canlapan revealed that the Statue of Liberty was eventually moved and stored at the BSP headquarters on Concepcion Street (now Natividad Almeda-Lopez) in Ermita, Manila.

Present condition
Gardens and pergolas were added to make the structure more appealing to the visitors and more suitable for special events. The area is managed by the Intramuros Administration, an attached agency of the Department of Tourism.

Marker from the Intramuros Administration

References
 Vasconcellos, Jorge e Julio Stumpf Military Principles Anapolis Naval Academy U.S. Navy Edit 1939. (Portugues, Spanish and English)

Buildings and structures in Intramuros
Tourist attractions in Manila
Forts in the Philippines
Spanish Colonial Fortifications of the Philippines
Cultural Properties of the Philippines in Metro Manila
Marked Historical Structures of the Philippines